Thinkin' Problem is the second studio album by American country music artist David Ball. It was released in 1994 (see 1994 in country music) on Warner Bros. Records Nashville. Although he had recorded an eponymous album for RCA Nashville in 1988 prior to the release of Thinkin' Problem, the RCA album was not released until later in 1994.

Thinkin' Problem was certified platinum by the RIAA for sales of one million copies in the United States. It produced five singles for him on the Billboard Hot Country Singles & Tracks (now Hot Country Songs) charts between 1994 and 1995. The first of these to chart was the title track, which reached number 2 on the country charts and number 40 on the Billboard Hot 100. Following it were "When the Thought of You Catches Up with Me" (number 7 on the country charts), "Look What Followed Me Home" (number 11), "What Do You Want with His Love" (number 48), and finally, "Honky Tonk Healin'" at number 50. 

"Blowin' Smoke" was also recorded by country singer, guitarist and songwriter Dennis Robbins for his 1994 album Born Ready.

Track listing

Personnel
David Ball – lead vocals, background vocals, acoustic guitar
Glen Duncan – fiddle
Sonny Garrish – steel guitar
Rob Hajacos – fiddle
Owen Hale – drums
Larry Marrs – background vocals
Brent Mason – acoustic guitar, electric guitar
Steve Nathan – piano
Suzi Ragsdale – background vocals
Hank Singer – fiddle
Stephony Smith – background vocals
Blaine Sprouce – fiddle
Tommy Spurlock – steel guitar
Harry Stinson – background vocals
Verlon Thompson – acoustic guitar
Cindy Richardson Walker – background vocals
Glenn Worf – bass guitar
Stuart Ziff – acoustic guitar, electric guitar

Charts

Weekly charts

Year-end charts

References

1994 debut albums
Warner Records albums
David Ball (country singer) albums
Albums produced by Blake Chancey